Timothy Lance Dobbins (born December 10, 1982) is a former American football linebacker. He was drafted by the San Diego Chargers in the fifth round of the 2006 NFL Draft. Dobbins played college football at Iowa State.

Early years
Dobbins attended Glencliff Comprehensive High School in Nashville, Tennessee and led the Colts to the 1999 TSSAA Class 5A State Champion Runner-Up. He was also picked by the TSWA as a first team All State Linebacker in 2001 which was his senior year. Tim played at Glencliff with some of the most talented players to ever play at the school. During his career, he played with multiple other All State players that went on to have success at  the college and professional levels. Those players include current Arena Football star CJ Johnson, who plays for the Georgia Force, former Buffalo Bills DB, Deon Giddens and former starting Tulsa DB CJ Scott.

College career
At Iowa State University, Dobbins earned all Big 12 honors in his senior season. He led the Cyclones to the Houston Bowl in 2005 and to the Independence Bowl in 2004. He played under coach Dan McCarney. He went to Community College at Copiah-Lincoln Community College in 2002-2003. Made all MACJC Team both years.

Professional career

2006 NFL Draft
Dobbins was selected 151st overall in the 5th round of the 2006 NFL Draft by the Chargers.

San Diego Chargers
Dobbins entered the 2007 season as the first linebacker off the bench behind Stephen Cooper and Matt Wilhelm. In the 2007 NFL Draft, A. J. Smith added some more competition to the linebacking corps with the additions of Anthony Waters and Brandon Siler.

Miami Dolphins
Dobbins was included in a trade during the first round of the 2010 NFL Draft that sent him to the Miami Dolphins. After one season in Miami, he was released on August 1, 2011.

Houston Texans
On August 6, 2011, Dobbins signed with the Houston Texans.

During the divisional playoff game against the Baltimore Ravens, Dobbins stuffed Ray Rice on fourth-and-goal to preserve a goal-line stand. However, the Texans lost 20-13.

After starting linebacker Brian Cushing tore his ACL in week 5 of the 2012 season, Dobbins took his spot in the starting lineup.

In week 10 against the Chicago Bears, Dobbins illegally hit Bears quarterback Jay Cutler, giving him a concussion. On November 14, 2012, Dobbins was fined $30,000 for the illegal hit against Cutler.

Dobbins was released by the Texans on October 22, 2013.

Atlanta Falcons
Dobbins signed with the Atlanta Falcons on June 18, 2014. He was released after the Falcons claimed Nate Stupar off waivers.

Dallas Cowboys
Dobbins signed with the Dallas Cowboys after a season-ending injury to linebacker Justin Durant. He was released on November 11, 2014, to make room on the roster for Josh Brent.

Statistics

Regular season

Source: NFL.com

References

External links
Miami Dolphins bio

1982 births
Living people
Players of American football from Nashville, Tennessee
American football linebackers
Copiah-Lincoln Wolfpack football players
Iowa State Cyclones football players
San Diego Chargers players
Miami Dolphins players
Houston Texans players
Atlanta Falcons players
Dallas Cowboys players